Shrimp Boat was an American rock band formed in Chicago, Illinois in 1987. After the band dissolved in 1993, Sam Prekop and Eric Claridge formed The Sea and Cake. Ian Schneller and Tom Jasek went on to form Falstaff.  Schneller's experience with the band would also lead him to create Specimen Products.

Members
Eric Claridge (drums, bass)
David Kroll (bass, banjo, tenor sax)
Sam Prekop (vocals, guitar, bass)
Ian Schneller (guitar, vocals, drums)
Brad Wood (drums, soprano sax, keyboard)

Non-official members
Joe Vajarsky (max sax)
Tom Jasek (drums)

Discography
Some Biscuit (1988)
Daylight Savings (1988)
Speckly (1989)
Volume One (1991)
Duende (1992)
Small Wonder EP (1993)
Cavale (1993)
Something Grand (2004)

References

External links

Alternative rock groups from Chicago
American post-rock groups
Indie rock musical groups from Illinois
Musical groups established in 1987
Musical groups disestablished in 1993
Rough Trade Records artists
Bar/None Records artists
AUM Fidelity artists